Yavaşlar can refer to:

 Yavaşlar, Ezine
 Yavaşlar, Sandıklı